The 1994–95 snooker season was a series of snooker tournaments played between August 1994 and May 1995. The following table outlines the results for ranking events and the invitational events.


Calendar

Official rankings 

The top 16 of the world rankings, these players automatically played in the final rounds of the world ranking events and were invited for the Masters.

Points distribution 
1994/1995 points distribution of world ranking events from the televised stages:

Notes

References

External links

1994
Season 1995
Season 1994